Räderschnitza (Sorbian Radošnica) is a small river in Saxony, Germany. It flows through Gablenz, and joins the Lusatian Neisse in Bad Muskau.

See also
List of rivers of Saxony

References 

Rivers of Saxony
Rivers of Germany